Professorville is a registered historic district in Palo Alto, California that contains homes that were built by Stanford University professors. The historic district is bounded by Kingsley and Addison avenues and the cross streets of Ramona and Waverley. The community considers the district to be larger and bounded by Addison and Cowper St. to the north west and north east and Emerson St. and Embarcadero Rd. to the south west and south east.

Origins 

The Professorville Historic District reflects the area's origins and its early years related to the founding of both Stanford University and Palo Alto itself. Stanford University allowed professors to build houses on Stanford land, but would only lease the land. Professorville was the closest place to the campus and downtown Palo Alto that was not owned by Stanford. Professors who preferred to own their own land rather than lease it from the Stanfords built their homes there. Lot sizes in Professorville vary greatly in size and location, including flag lots. The developer of the tract was eager to sell the land and so he sold various lot sizes including full blocks and half blocks. The owners of the large lots then sold off portions of their property, starting at the outer edges, until the original buildings themselves were on a modest sized remaining lot. In February 2023, the median list price for houses in Professorville was $4.34 million.

Architecture 

The buildings most representative of Professorville are brown-shingled houses with gambrel roofs, whose stylistic influences range from Colonial Revival to American Craftsman. Dutch Colonials are the predominant architecture on three blocks of Kingsley Avenue.

One of the largest residences, a 3-story, 14-room frame house at 450 Kingsley, is the former home of Stanford's first physics professor, Fernando Sanford designed by architect Frank McMurray of Chicago. The house includes features fashionable at the time such as a Queen Anne corner tower and a Palladian window in front.

Other former professors' houses include 1005 Bryant, built for professor Frank Angell who founded the university's psychology department, and 433 Melville, built for professor Charles Henry Gilbert, founding chair of the Zoology Department, and designed by Professor Arthur Bridgman Clark, an architect and art professor. The "Dead Houses" (named after the Grateful Dead) is a cooperative housing community centered in Professorville, primarily inhabited by Stanford students and recent graduates, with notable past tenants including Sean Parker.

See also
Ramona Street Architectural District

Footnotes

References

External links
 Professorville, Palo Alto
 Professorville Faculty have left, history remains in this island of tradition
 Professorville Historic Tour, Palo Alto Historical Association, Available at the Palo Alto Main Library
 Professorville, Palo Alto - Neighborhood Tour

National Register of Historic Places in Santa Clara County, California
Houses on the National Register of Historic Places in California
Houses in Palo Alto, California
Historic districts on the National Register of Historic Places in California